Durrës Castle is the fortified old city of Durrës, Albania. It is enclosed by city walls built in the late 5th century, and repaired and reinforced in the Middle Ages and early modern periods.

History
The castle was built by the Byzantine Emperor Anastasius I (r. 491–518), who came from Durrës (ancient Dyrrhachium). At the time, Anastasius made the city one of the most fortified cities on the Adriatic. The ancient walls were devastated in an earthquake in 1273, and had to be extensively repaired. The castle was reinforced with several guard towers by the Republic of Venice and during the period of rule in Albania by the Ottoman Empire the wall was reinforced.

On 7 April 1939, Albanian patriots fought the Italian invasion of Albania. In Durrës, a force of only 360 Albanians, mostly gendarmes and townspeople, led by Abaz Kupi, the commander of the gendarmerie in Durrës, and Mujo Ulqinaku, a marine official, tried to halt the Italian advance. Armed only with small arms and three machine guns, they succeeded in keeping the Italians at bay for several hours until a large number of light tanks disembarked from the latter's naval vessels. After that, resistance diminished and within five hours the Italian forces had captured the entire city.

Modern

In February 2022 it was announced that The Durrës Castle would begin Restoration on the Main Durrës Tower by the EU4Culture Group In Albania. This Restoration project is presumed to take 6 Months to Complete and the cost of investment for the project is 675,000 Euros. This Project will Conserve and Upgrade the Infrastructure of the Tower and will add a new digital and classic interpretation of the tower and many other things that will go beyond just a regular Infrastructure Repair. This Restoration will turn the Durrës Tower into the first heritage interpretation center in Albania.,

Gallery

See also
Durrës
History of Albania
Venetian Albania
Anastasius I (emperor)
Thopia family
Karl Thopia
Italian invasion of Albania
Mujo Ulqinaku
Tourism in Albania
List of castles in Albania
Architecture of Albania

References

Buildings and structures completed in the 5th century
Castles in Albania
Byzantine military architecture
Buildings and structures in Durrës
Tourist attractions in Durrës County
Roman fortifications in Macedonia
City walls
5th-century fortifications